Haganj   is a village in Croatia. It is connected by the D28 highway.

Populated places in Zagreb County